Worcester County is the name of two counties in the United States of America:
Worcester County, Massachusetts
Worcester County, Maryland

See also 
Worcestershire, England